Swamptrash were a Scottish bluegrass/psychobilly band formed in 1987 in Edinburgh. They split in 1990 and several of the members went on to form Shooglenifty. The band has been recognized as crucial to the development of experimental Scottish acoustic music.

Personnel
Members have included:
Harry Horse - Vocals, banjo (later played in Hexology and worked as a children's author, political illustrator/cartoonist for The Scotsman and The Herald newspapers, and developer of the video game Drowned God)
Neil McArthur - fiddle
James MacIntosh - drums (now playing with Capercaillie, Shooglenifty and Michael McGoldrick amongst others)
Garry "Banjo" Finlayson - banjo (now playing in Shooglenifty)
Malcolm Crosbie - guitar (now playing in Shooglenifty)
Nick Prescott - mandolin
Conrad Molleson - bass (later played in Shooglenifty, now playing with Catriona MacDonald amongst others)
Angus R. Grant - fiddle (later in Shooglenifty, now deceased)

Discography
It Makes No Never Mind  - DDT Records (1987 album)
Bone (6 track EP recorded as a session for Janice Long on BBC Radio 1)

References

External links

Scottish alternative rock groups
Bluegrass musicians
Rockabilly music groups